Aq Kariz (also Romanized as Āq Kārīz; also known as Āq Kahrīzak, Aq Kahrīz, and Qal‘eh-ye Kahrīz) is a village in Shirin Darreh Rural District, in the Central District of Quchan County, Razavi Khorasan Province, Iran. At the 2006 census, its population was 1,109, in 269 families.

See also 

 List of cities, towns and villages in Razavi Khorasan Province

References 

Populated places in Quchan County